The fourth season of the Seven Network television series A Place to Call Home premiered on Showcase on 11 September 2016. The series was produced by Chris Martin-Jones, and executive produced by Penny Win and Julie McGauran.

Production
On 15 October 2014, it was announced that Foxtel had finalised a deal with Channel Seven that would see third and fourth seasons written, using the outlines created by Bevan Lee, produced by Seven Productions, but aired on Foxtel.

On 25 October 2014, Amy Harris of The Daily Telegraph announced that A Place to Call Home had been officially renewed for another two seasons and would return in late 2015, airing on Foxtel channel SoHo. It was also announced that all the original cast and crew members would return.

Production on the fourth season began on 29 February 2016 and concluded on 5 August 2016. The episode order was extended from the usual 10 episodes to 12, with Foxtel's Director of Television, Brian Walsh stating, "we have extended the commission order to 12 episodes this year because the storylines are so strong".

Having departed the series at the end of the second season, Bevan Lee returned to helm this year as Script Executive, with Katherine Thomson taking over from Susan Bower as Script Producer. Shirley Barrett, Kriv Stenders, Catherine Millar and Tony Krawitz serve as directors for this season.

Of the show's return, Foxtel's Head of Drama, Penny Win stated, "Working with Seven Productions on A Place to Call Home'''s has resulted in fantastic achievements for the series. With record breaking audiences for the SoHo channel, the passionate and dedicated fans and the growing audience around the world, the show is a testament to Foxtel's commitment to great Australian storytelling." Seven's Head of Drama, Julie McGauran stated, "A Place to Call Home'' has been a hugely successful collaboration between Seven Productions and Foxtel. Together we’ve been able to engineer a wonderful partnership for everyone, especially the fans, who have so much to look forward to in season 4."

The series was also planned to air on Showcase, after SoHo was closed by Foxtel.

Plot
In this season, the characters are strongly affected by two contrasting social issues in 1954. The first is the conservative wave of fear generated by the "Reds Under the Beds" scare surrounding the Petrov Affair. The second, the wave of liberal change that opened up new social and moral choices for Australians at the time.

Cast

Main
 Marta Dusseldorp as Sarah Nordmann
 Noni Hazelhurst as Elizabeth Bligh
 Brett Climo as George Bligh
 Craig Hall as Dr. Jack Duncan
 David Berry as James Bligh
 Abby Earl as Anna Poletti
 Arianwen Parkes-Lockwood as Olivia Bligh
 Aldo Mignone as Gino Poletti
 Sara Wiseman as Carolyn Duncan
 Jenni Baird as Regina Bligh
 Frankie J. Holden as Roy Briggs

Recurring & Guest
 Deborah Kennedy as Doris Collins
 Brenna Harding as Rose O'Connell
 Heather Mitchell as Prudence Swanson
 Mark Lee as Sir Richard Bennett
 Tim Draxl as Dr. Henry Fox
 Dominic Allburn as Harry Polson
 Rohan Nichol as Sergeant Brian Taylor
 Rick Donald as Lloyd Ellis Parker 
 Robert Coleby as Douglas Goddard
 Leigh Scully as Gordon Walsh 
 Alan Dearth as Robert Menzies

Episodes

Ratings

References

External links 

 
 
 

2016 Australian television seasons